Joseph Delteil (20 April 1894 – 16 April 1978) was a 20th-century French writer and poet.

Biography 

Joseph Delteil was born in the farm of La Pradeille, from a woodcutter-charcoal father and a "buissonnière" mother. Joseph Delteil spent the first four years of his childhood at the Borie (construction of dry stones) of Guillamau, 30 kilometers south of Carcassonne, in the Val de Dagne. Of this hovel, today there remain only stumps of walls, which one can always see while hiking on the "Path in poetry" at the entrance of which one reads "Here the time goes on foot" created by Magalie Arnaud, mayor of Villar-en-Val, and her friends to honor the memory of the poet.

In 1898, his father purchased a vineyard plot at Pieusse (30 kilometers further on the side of Limoux). This was, according to Delteil, his "native village", in the heart of the land of the Blanquette de Limoux, "where the landscape grows, from the forest to the sun, from Occitan to French ". He remained there until his Certificat d'études primaires (1907), then he joined the Saint-Louis school in Limoux. He was then a student at the Collège Saint-Stanislas (small seminary) in Carcassonne.

The publication in 1922 of his first novel Sur le fleuve Amour attracted the attention of Louis Aragon and Andre Breton for whom this work "compensated for so many devils to the body." Delteil collaborated with the magazine Literature and participated in the drafting of the pamphlet Un cadavre written in response to the national funeral of Anatole France (October 1924). Breton quotes him in his Surrealist Manifesto as one of those who have done "an act of absolute surrealism."

On May 24, 1924, at the "Soirée du Claridge" where the former Russian Page Corps was giving a charity ball, a fashion show with costumes by Sonia Delaunay illustrated a poem by Joseph Delteil La Mode qui vient. "The appearance of this group raised the applause of the social gathering".

The publication in 1925 of his Jeanne d'Arc, a work rewarded by the Prix Femina, aroused the rejection of the Surrealists and of Breton in particular, in spite of the scandal caused by the anti-conformist vision Of the Maid of Orleans. For Breton, this work was a "vast shit". Delteil participated in the first issue of La Révolution surréaliste, but after an interview in which he declared that he never dreamed, he received a letter of rupture from Breton.

In 1931, he fell seriously ill and left literature and Parisian life for the south of France.

In his Occitan retreat, he maintained strong friendships with writers (Henry Miller), poets (Frédéric Jacques Temple)), singers (Charles Trenet, Georges Brassens), painters (Pierre Soulages), and actors (Jean-Claude Drouot). By publishing La Deltheillerie in 1968, he regained some of the notoriety of 1920, supported by personalities like Jacques Chancel, Jean-Louis Bory, and Jean-Marie Drot.

He is buried, along with his wife Caroline, in the Pieusse cemetery.

Works 

1919: Le Cœur grec
1921: Le Cygne androgyne
1922: Sur le Fleuve Amour
1923: Choléra
1924: Les Cinq sens
1925: Jeanne d'Arc, (novel), Prix Femina)
1925: Le Discours aux oiseaux par Saint François d'Assise
1925: Les Poilus
1926: Mes amours...(...spirituelles)
1926: Allo ! Paris
1926: Ode à Limoux
1927: Perpignan
1927: La Jonque de porcelaine
1928: La Fayette
1928: Le Mal de cœur
1928: De J.-J. Rousseau à Mistral
1929: Il était une fois Napoléon
1929: Les Chats de Paris
1930: La Belle Corisande
1930: La Belle Aude
1930: Don Juan
1931: La Nuit des bêtes
1931: Le Vert Galant
1944: A la Belle étoile
1947: Jésus II
1960:François d'Assise
1961: Œuvres complètes
1964: La Cuisine paléolithique - éditions Robert Morel, Grand Prix international de littérature gastronomique 1965
1968: La Deltheillerie
1976: Le sacré corps
1980: Correspondance privée Henry Miller-Joseph Delteil, Paris, Pierre Belfond, 1980 (foreword, translation and notes by Frédéric Jacques Temple)
1990: Musée de marine
1994: Les Prisonniers de l'infini
1995: Le Maître ironique
2005: L'Homme coupé en morceaux

Studies devoted to Joseph Delteil 
 André de Richaud, Vie de saint Delteil, Paris, La Nouvelle Société d'Édition, 1928.
 Maryse Choisy, Delteil tout nu, Paris, éd. Montaigne, 1930.
 Christian Chabanis, « Joseph Delteil au cœur du monde » in Le Figaro Littéraire, 30 December 1961.
 Claude Schmitt, « Joseph Delteil ou l'épithète introuvable » in revue L'Honneur, 1970.
 Collective under the direction of Claude Schmitt, Delteil est au ciel !, Alfred Eibel Éditeur, 1979.
 Robert Briatte, Joseph Delteil, coll. « Qui êtes-vous ? », Lyon, La Manufacture, 1988.
 Jean-Marie Drot, Joseph Delteil prophète de l'an 2000, Imago, 1990.
 Jean-Louis Malves, Delteil en habit de lumière, Éditions Loubatières, 1992
 Collectif s/d de Robert Briatte, Les Aventures du récit chez Joseph Delteil, Montpellier, Éd. de la Jonque/Presses du Languedoc, 1995
 Collective under the direction of Denitza Bantcheva, Joseph Delteil, coll. « Les Dossiers H », L'Âge d'homme, 1998.
 Denis Wetterwald, Joseph Delteil. Les escales d'un marin étrusque, Christian Pirot éditeur, 1999.
 , Joseph Delteil brille pour tout le monde, Samuel Tastet éditeur, 2006.
 Marie-Françoise Lemonnier-Delpy, Joseph Delteil : une œuvre épique au XXe, destinées du héros et révolution du récit, Éditions IDECO, 2006.
 « Les Riches heures de Joseph Delteil » Metz, imprimerie Jean Vodaine, 1977. Triple issue (23,24,25) of the journal Dire. Typographie au plomb par Arthur Praillet. Pur chiffon de Lana. 50 copies.

References

External links 
 Site entirely devoted to Joseph Delteil

20th-century French poets
French male poets
Prix Femina winners
Surrealist poets
1894 births
People from Aude
1978 deaths
20th-century French male writers